These are the results of the 2021 Asian Wrestling Championships which took place between 13 and 18 April 2021 in Almaty, Kazakhstan.

Men's freestyle

57 kg
17 April

61 kg
18 April

65 kg
17 April

70 kg
17 April

74 kg
18 April

79 kg
17 April

86 kg
18 April

92 kg
18 April

97 kg
17 April

125 kg
18 April

Men's Greco-Roman

55 kg
13 April

60 kg
14 April

63 kg
13 April

67 kg
14 April

72 kg
14 April

77 kg
13 April

82 kg
14 April

87 kg
13 April

97 kg
14 April

130 kg
13 April

Women's freestyle

50 kg
15 April

53 kg
16 April

55 kg
15 April

 Madina Usmonjonova of Uzbekistan originally won the silver medal, but was disqualified after she tested positive for Furosemide.

57 kg
16 April

59 kg
15 April

62 kg
16 April

65 kg
16 April

68 kg
15 April

72 kg
16 April

76 kg
15 April

References

External links
Official website

2021 Results